Eucalyptus ordiana is a species of small tree or a mallee that is endemic to the Kimberley area of Western Australia. It has smooth, powdery bark, egg-shaped leaves, flower buds in groups of seven, white flowers and cup-shaped fruit.

Description
It has smooth, white, powdery bark on the trunk and branches. Flowering occurs from April to May and the flowers are white.

Taxonomy and naming
Eucalyptus ordiana was first formally described in 1992 by Clyde Dunlop and Christopher Done in the journal Nuytsia from material collected near Lake Kununurra in the Kimberley. The specific epithet ordiana refers to the Ord River with a Latin ending meaning "belonging to".

Distribution and habitat
This eucalypt grows in shrubland and open woodland on sandstone ranges. It is only known from near Kununurra.

Conservation status
This species is classified as "Priority Two" by the Western Australian Government Department of Parks and Wildlife meaning that it is poorly known and from only one or a few locations.

See also
List of Eucalyptus species

References

Eucalypts of Western Australia
ordiana
Myrtales of Australia
Plants described in 1992